The 2010 Emir of Qatar Cup is the 38th edition of a cup tournament in men's football (soccer). It is played by the 1st and 2nd Level divisions of the Qatari football league structure.

The top four sides of the 2009–10 Qatar Stars League season enter at the quarter-final stage.

Al-Gharrafa are the defending champions.

The cup winner were guaranteed a place in the 2011 AFC Champions League.

First round

The first round of the competition involves four teams from the 2nd tier league.

|colspan="3" style="background-color:#99CCCC"|11 April 2010

|}

Round 2

|colspan="3" style="background-color:#99CCCC"|15 April 2010

|-
|colspan="3" style="background-color:#99CCCC"|16 April 2010

|}

Round 3

|colspan="3" style="background-color:#99CCCC"|25 April 2010

|-
|colspan="3" style="background-color:#99CCCC"|26 April 2010

|-
|}

Quarter-finals
Top 4 league sides join this round

|colspan="3" style="background-color:#99CCCC"|30 April 2010

|-
|colspan="3" style="background-color:#99CCCC"|1 May 2010

|-
|colspan="3" style="background-color:#99CCCC"|2 May 2010

|-
|colspan="3" style="background-color:#99CCCC"|3 May 2010

|-
|}

Semi-finals

|colspan="3" style="background-color:#99CCCC"|7 May 2010

|-
|colspan="3" style="background-color:#99CCCC"|8 May 2010

|-
|}

Final

|colspan="3" style="background-color:#99CCCC"|15 May 2010

|}

Football competitions in Qatar